The 1957 Railway Cup Hurling Championship was the 31st series of the inter-provincial hurling Railway Cup. Four matches were played between 17 February 1957 and 17 March 1957 to decide the title. It was contested by Connacht, Leinster, Munster and Ulster.

Leinster entered the championship as the defending champions.

On 17 March 1957, Munster won the Railway Cup after a 5-07 to 2-05 defeat of Leinster in the final at Croke Park, Dublin. It was their 23rd Railway Cup title overall and their first Railway Cup title since 1955.

Munster's Christy Ring was the Railway Cup top scorer with 5-10.

Results

Semi-finals

Final

Top scorers

Overall

Single game

Sources

 Donegan, Des, The Complete Handbook of Gaelic Games (DBA Publications Limited, 2005).

References

Railway Cup Hurling Championship
Railway Cup Hurling Championship